Brij Kishor Bind is an Indian politician from Bharatiya Janata Party and was the former cabinet minister of Mines, Geology, Backward and EBC Welfare department in the Government of Bihar. He has been elected on three occasions as a MLA for the Chainpur constituency in Kaimur district, Bihar.

References 

Living people
Year of birth missing (living people)
People from Kaimur district
Bharatiya Janata Party politicians from Bihar
Bihar MLAs 2015–2020
State cabinet ministers of Bihar